KXJN (97.7 FM) is a radio station licensed to Moose Wilson Road, Wyoming, United States. The station is currently owned by Cochise Media Licenses LLC.

References

External links
 

XJN
Teton County, Wyoming
Radio stations established in 2009
2009 establishments in Wyoming